The Afghanistan cricket team toured the United Arab Emirates to play Zimbabwe from 25 December 2015 to 10 January 2016. The tour consisted of five One Day Internationals (ODIs) and two Twenty20 Internationals (T20Is) matches. All the matches took place at the Sharjah Cricket Association Stadium.

Afghanistan won the ODI series 3–2. With this victory, they made the top ten of the ODI rankings for the first time. Afghanistan won the T20I series 2–0. Following the conclusion of the series, Afghan batsman Mohammad Shahzad entered the ICC's T20I batting rankings in eighth place. His teammate Dawlat Zadran entered the ICC's list for best bowlers in T20I cricket, also in eighth place.

Squads

ODI series

1st ODI

2nd ODI

3rd ODI

4th ODI

5th ODI

T20I series

1st T20I

2nd T20I

References

External links
 Series home at ESPNcricinfo

2015 in Afghan cricket
2016 in Afghan cricket
2015 in Zimbabwean cricket
2016 in Zimbabwean cricket
International cricket competitions in 2015–16
Afghan cricket tours of the United Arab Emirates
Zimbabwean cricket tours of the United Arab Emirates
Afghan 2015
2015 in Emirati cricket
2016 in Emirati cricket